The First Chōshū expedition was a punitive military expedition by the Tokugawa shogunate against the Chōshū Domain in September–November 1864. The expedition was in retaliation for Chōshū's role in the attack on the Kyoto Imperial Palace during the Kinmon incident in August 1864. The expedition ended in a nominal victory for the shogunate after a deal negotiated by Saigō Takamori allowed Chōshū to hand over the ringleaders of the Kinmon incident.

Background
The First Chōshū expedition was launched on 1 September 1864.

The conflict finally led to a compromise brokered by the Satsuma Domain at the end of 1864. Although Satsuma initially jumped on the opportunity to weaken its traditional Chōshū enemy, it soon realized that the intention of the Bakufu was first to neutralize Chōshū, and then to neutralize Satsuma. For this reason, Saigō Takamori, who was one of the Commanders of the shogunate forces, proposed to avoid fighting and instead obtain the leaders responsible for the rebellion. Chōshū was relieved to accept, as were the shogunate forces, who were not much interested in battle. Thus ended the First Chōshū expedition without a fight, as a nominal victory for the Bakufu.

See also
 Second Chōshū expedition
 Bakumatsu

Notes

Conflicts in 1864
Wars involving Japan
Choshu
1864 in Japan
September 1864 events
October 1864 events
November 1864 events